The MLW Open Draft was a draft used by the American professional wrestling promotion Major League Wrestling (MLW) to refresh its roster in preparation for the promotion's return to live touring following the COVID-19 pandemic. Wrestlers were selected by MLW's various stables (referred to by MLW as "fight teams") among eight rounds, beginning on May 20, 2021 and concluding on July 10, 2021.

Background
On April 21, 2021, it was announced that MLW would hold their first event with ticketed fans since the start of the COVID-19 pandemic on July 10. This event would mark the first time that live ticketed fans would attend a MLW event since AAA vs MLW in March 2020. 

As part of the preparations for the return to live touring, Alicia Atout, on the May 5, 2021 episode of Fusion, announced that an open draft would be taking place on MLW's website and official YouTube channel where various wrestlers from the MLW roster as well as free agents from various promotions in Japan, Mexico, and the independent circuit would be drafted by the promotion's stables in an effort to refresh the roster. Later on the episode, former Lucha Underground authority figure Dario Cueto was revealed to be "El Jefe", the mysterious figure who sacrificed Salina de la Renta for not paying him for providing financial assistance to Renta's group Promociones Dorado. The new ring name of Cueto would later be revealed to be "Cesar Duran", with Duran representing his own stable called Azteca Underground. Azteca Underground, 5150, American Top Team, Contra Unit, The Dynasty, Injustice, Team Filthy, and MLW were the stables that wrestlers could possibly get drafted to. The draft began on May 20.

Selections
The first round of the open draft began on May 20 with various wrestlers, including both members of the MLW roster and free agents, being drafted in the succeeding rounds. The final round concluded on July 10 at Battle Riot III.

Round 1 (May 20)

Round 2 (May 27)

Round 3 (June 3)

Round 4 (June 10)

Round 5 (June 17)

Round 6 (June 24)

Round 7 (July 1)

Round 8 (July 10)

Notes

References

External links
Major League Wrestling official website

MLW draft
Major League Wrestling